The Nanchang–Jiujiang intercity railway is an intercity high-speed railway operated by China Railway Nanchang Group, connecting Nanchang (the provincial capital) and Jiujiang, in Jiangxi Province, China. It is the first newly constructed high-speed railway in Jiangxi Province.

At Jiujiang, the railway connects with the Wuhan–Jiujiang Passenger Railway, opened in 2017, providing a continuous high-speed line between Nanchang and Wuhan.

Stations 
 Jiujiang
 Lushan
 De'an
 Gongqingcheng
 Yongxiu
 Nanchang West

See also
Nanchang–Jiujiang high-speed railway: runs roughly parallel to this railway but will have a higher maximum speed, and will end at Lushan railway station in Chaisang District rather than Jiujiang railway station in Lianxi District.

Rail transport in Jiangxi
Jiujiang
Transport in Nanchang
Railway lines opened in 2010
High-speed railway lines in China